This is a list of fortifications in Serbia. The list includes remains (ruins) of military constructions; fortresses (tvrđave), castles (zamci), towers (kule), etc. There are over 30 preserved forts in Serbia, and more than hundreds of sites with remains of old fortifications. Forts in Serbia are preserved from the Roman, Byzantine, medieval Serbian and post-Ottoman eras. The majority of forts have been renovated throughout history with changing rule and adaptations to war technology development. Many forts are foundations of modern towns and cities, such as the Belgrade Fortress. Later, Western, Habsburg and Austro-Hungarian architecture exists in Vojvodina; Bač castle, Vršac. The fortified monasteries of Mileševa, Manasija and Ravanica served as protection to locals during harsh times. This list does not include palace castles, which are listed in a separate article.

List

Fortifications located within Kosovo are indicated in grey.

Annotations

Further reading

See also
Cultural Heritage of Serbia
List of World Heritage Sites in Serbia
Immovable Cultural Heritage of Great Importance (Serbia)
List of palaces and manor houses in Serbia
List of cities in Serbia
List of military conflicts involving Serbia
List of fortifications in Kosovo

 
Forts
Ruins in Serbia
Forts
Serbia
Serbia
Fortifications